This is a list of foodborne illness outbreaks. A foodborne illness may be from an infectious disease, heavy metals, chemical contamination, or from natural toxins, such as those found in poisonous mushrooms.

Deadliest
 List of foodborne illness outbreaks by death toll

Canada
 2008 Canada listeriosis outbreak

China
 2008 Chinese milk scandal

Germany
 2011 Escherichia coli O104:H4 outbreak

Japan
 Minamata disease
 Niigata Minamata disease
 1996 Japan E. coli O157:H7

Spain
 1981 Toxic oil syndrome

United Kingdom
 2005 outbreak of E.coli O157 in South Wales
 1996 outbreak of E. coli O157 in Lanarkshire, Scotland
 Loch Maree Hotel botulism poisoning

United States

In 1999, an estimated 5,000 deaths, 325,000 hospitalizations, and 76 million illnesses were caused by foodborne illnesses within the US. Illness outbreaks lead to food recalls.

See also
 List of foodborne illness outbreaks by death toll
 1984 Rajneeshee bioterror attack
 Eosinophilia–myalgia syndrome
 List of food contamination incidents
 List of medicine contamination incidents

References

Disease outbreaks

foodborne
Foodborne Illness
Public health-related lists